KGHD-LD (channel 6) is a low-power television station in Las Vegas, Nevada, United States. The station is owned by Obidia Porras.

KGHD-LD is operated as a hybrid radio/TV station. The TV portion broadcasts in the ATSC 3.0 (Next Gen TV) standard and airs programming from Diya TV. The radio station is broadcast at 87.75 MHz.

History
KGHD began operations in 2002 as K67HK channel 67 in St. George, Utah. It was built by the Trinity Broadcasting Network and broadcast TBN programs with 1.3 kW ERP.

In early 2010, K67HK was bought by Obidia Porras of Victorville, California; Porras operates KUHD-LP and other "franken-FMs" that use VHF analog channel 6. Needing to vacate the 700 MHz band, K67HK moved to channel 6. Porras then moved channel 6 from a transmitter site near Interstate 15 and Brigham Road to West Mountain Peak, and in 2010, K67HK became KGHD-LP. KGHD embarked on a piecemeal move down I-15 to Las Vegas, starting with a September 2010 move to a facility near Overton, Nevada. Not long after, KGHD went off the air due to a malfunctioning generator; the generator provided the only electrical service to the transmitter, and the only way to fix the problem was to find a new home. KGHD filed in 2011 to move to a site at Apex, on I-15 northeast of Las Vegas. One last move came in 2013, to Black Mountain—the main television and radio transmitter site in Las Vegas—as the Apex site's air conditioner ceased to function properly and jeopardized the transmitter equipment.

KGHD's first radio programming was a grupera format known as "La Primera"; during this time, Humberto Luna hosted the station's morning show, and the station (required as a TV station to broadcast video) aired a 30-minute video loop. After a period of silence beginning in the summer of 2015, KGHD returned in May 2016 as "La Raza" with a similar format. The station changed names and operators in 2020, becoming "Fiesta 87.7 FM".

As a result of the end of analog broadcasting for low-power stations on July 13, 2021, Latino Hustle Group purchased K251BS (98.1 FM), a translator that could be fed by the HD Radio subchannel of another station (KLUC-FM), to air its programming. Porras filed in February 2022 to convert to operations in the dual ATSC 3.0/FM mode in order to resume radio service.

On September 29, 2022, KGHD-LD launched "Area 87.7", featuring a mix of dance, hip-hop and alternative. On November 18, 2022, the station switched to dance full time and rebranded as "Acid 87.7".

Subchannel

See also
KUHD-LD, another "franken-FM" owned by Porras

References

External links

GHD-LD
Television channels and stations established in 2002
ATSC 3.0 television stations
Low-power television stations in the United States
Dance radio stations
Electronic dance music radio stations